Cristal Mountains, also known as Santo Antônio Mountains, are located in Brazil, in the state of Minas Gerais.

One of the tourist points of interests of the mountain range are Cristal Falls, they have  of height.

Mountain ranges of Brazil
Landforms of Minas Gerais